Plainfield Academy for the Arts and Advanced Studies (PAAAS) is a magnet six-year public middle school / high school specializing in visual and performing arts that serves students in seventh through twelfth grades from Plainfield, in Union County, New Jersey, United States. The school is part of the Plainfield Public School District, one of New Jersey's 31 former Abbott districts. Opened in September 2009, the school requires that students are residents of the city who have been enrolled in the district for a minimum of a year.

As of the 2021–22 school year, the school had an enrollment of 385 students and 39.0 classroom teachers (on an FTE basis), for a student–teacher ratio of 9.9:1. There were 243 students (63.1% of enrollment) eligible for free lunch and 61 (15.8% of students) eligible for reduced-cost lunch.

Awards and recognition
Plainfield Academy for the Arts and Advanced Studies (PAAAS) was ranked by U.S. News & World Report at 137th among New Jersey’s 551 secondary schools and ranked within the top 40% in the nation.

Administration
The school's principal is Gregory Sneed.

References

External links
Plainfield Academy for the Arts and Advanced Studies
Plainfield Public School District

School Data for the Plainfield Public School District, National Center for Education Statistics
 "Plainfield school principal claims she's paid less because she's a white female"

Plainfield, New Jersey
2009 establishments in New Jersey
Educational institutions established in 2009
Public high schools in Union County, New Jersey